Elizabeth Courtenay may refer to:

Elizabeth Grey, Viscountess Lisle, married name Courtenay, Tudor noblewoman
Elizabeth of Courtenay (ca. 1199–1269 or later), daughter of Peter II of Courtenay and Yolanda of Flanders
Elizabeth Courtenay, Countess of Devon (1801–1867), formerly Lady Elizabeth Fortescue

See also
Elizabeth Courtney (disambiguation)